Joseph Roddy (1897 – 3 October 1965) was an Irish Fine Gael politician.

Early and personal life
Roddy was born in 1897 at Kilmacowen, County Sligo, one of at least four sons and two daughters of Patrick Roddy, a farmer, and Jane Roddy (née O'Hara). He was educated at the local national school and at Summerhill College, Sligo town. He never married.

His brother Martin Roddy served as a Fine Gael TD from 1925 to 1948. From 1948 he was a director of Champion Publications, which owned The Sligo Champion. He also farmed the family lands at Breeogue, County Sligo.

Political career
Roddy was elected to Dáil Éireann as a Fine Gael Teachta Dála (TD) for the Sligo–Leitrim constituency at the 1948 general election. He retained his seat until losing it at the 1957 general election., but was elected to the 9th Seanad by the Industrial and Commercial Panel serving until 1961. 

He was a member of Sligo County Council from 1948 until his death in 1965, and served as its chairman from 1950 to 1951 and 1955 to 1965.

References

1897 births
1965 deaths
Fine Gael TDs
Irish farmers
Members of the 13th Dáil
Members of the 14th Dáil
Members of the 15th Dáil
Members of the 9th Seanad
Politicians from County Sligo
Fine Gael senators
People educated at Summerhill College